Pacific Lutheran College is a co-educational K–12 Lutheran College under the Lutheran Church of Australia. The school is located in Meridan Plains, Sunshine Coast, Queensland, Australia. Pacific Lutheran College caters for 900 to 1000 students, after opening in 2001 as one of the newest private schools on the Sunshine Coast.

Pacific Lutheran College is a member of the Sunshine Coast Independent Schools' Sports Association (SCISSA) and as such participates in a range of sports including soccer, rugby union, basketball, surfing, kayaking, swimming, water volleyball, touch football, netball, dance and athletics. Pacific Lutheran College competes against local independent schools such as Sunshine Coast Grammar School, Matthew Flinders Anglican College, Good Shepard Lutheran College, Immanuel Lutheran College, St. Andrews Anglican College, Unity College and Suncoast Christian College.

Houses

Notable former students
Kaylee McKeown (born 2001), Olympic swimmer

References

External links

Schools on the Sunshine Coast, Queensland
Kawana Waters, Queensland
Lutheran schools in Australia
Private secondary schools in Queensland
Private primary schools in Queensland
Educational institutions established in 2001
2001 establishments in Australia
High schools and secondary schools affiliated with the Lutheran Church
Elementary and primary schools affiliated with the Lutheran Church